Ammachi Panapillai Amma was the title held by the consort of the ruling Maharajah of Travancore as well as those of other title-holding male members of the Travancore Royal Family. 

Its literal translation is 'consort' since as per the formerly existent matriarchal system in Travancore, the Maharajah's sister was the Maharani, and not his wife. Thus the wife, a non-royal, took the title of Ammachi Panapillai Amma.

The Ammachis were mostly from families of the Nair nobility. The Maharajahs married these ladies through the Sambandham form of wedlock known as Pattum Parivattavum.

Origin
The Maharajahs of Travancore (current south Kerala) adopted the Matrilineal custom and inheritance prevalent in the land around the 14th Century AD. Accordingly, when a king died, his nephew (sister's son) would become the next ruler.

Ammaveedus

Families from where Maharajas got married were known as Ammaveedus. It is believed that when the then Travancore King, Maharajah Sree Karthika Thirunal Dharamaraja shifted capital from Padmanabhapuram to Thiruvananthapuram, he brought along his four  wives who belonged to the places namely Vadasseri, Nagercoil, Arumana, and Thiruvattar. The new houses, referred to as Ammaveedus (ancestral homes of Ammachis) were constructed in the new capital and were named Arumana Ammaveedu, Vadasseri Ammaveedu, Nagercoil Ammaveedu, Thiruvattar Ammaveedu. The Maharajah also passed a rule that all the Royal male members should only marry from one of the above-mentioned four Ammaveedus. This gave social prominence to the Ammachis as well as their homes.

The Kings of Travancore traditionally took wives from Ammaveedus and the Consorts, known as Ammachis would get the additional title of Panapillai Amma. If at all another lady from outside the Ammaveedu's  was to be married to the King, she would be adopted to one of the Ammaveedus first and then wed to the King. This was the case in the marriage of Maharajah Swathi Thirunal, Maharajah Ayilyam Thirunal and Maharajah Moolam Thirunal.

Social Status

Even though Ammachis and her children were held in high social esteem, they had neither any royal titles nor any political power. They remained outsiders and were considered inferior to her husband and his family, and neither they had any communications with other royal members. The Ammachis were not supposed to be seen publicly with their royal spouses; they couldn't travel in the same carriages. If at all they travelled with the Maharajah they were to be seated opposite to their spouses and never beside them. The Maharajahs neither partook any food cooked by their consorts nor the consorts were allowed to take food alongside royal members. As times changed, the restrictions also got reduced. 

Rev. Samuel Mateer in 19th Century observed the following about the position of Ammachis of Travancore:

 

Despite all these limitations, historians point out that the Ammachis were compensated with material benefits like tax exemption to land and other properties, comfortable living provisions as well as other honours.

References

 Travancore State Manual by V.Nagam Aiya

Indian court titles
Noble titles
Titles in India
People from Thiruvananthapuram
Travancore royal family
Nair
Women of the Kingdom of Travancore
People of the Kingdom of Travancore